Lady Sleep is the third studio album by German musician Maximilian Hecker.  It was released in 2005 by Kitty-Yo.

Track listing
 Birch
 Anaesthesia
 Summer Days In Bloom
 Daze Of Nothing
 Everything Inside Me Is Ill
 Full Of Voices
 Help Me
 Snow
 Dying
 Yeah, Eventually She Goes
 Lady Sleep

References

2005 albums
Maximilian Hecker albums